Lubor Jan Zink (September 20, 1920 – November 6, 2003) was a Czech-Canadian writer and columnist known for his anti-Communism.

Early life
Zink was born in Klapý, Czechoslovakia. He was a student of economics at Czech Technical University in Prague in March 1939 when Nazi Germany invaded and occupied the country. A member of the Czech underground movement, Zink fled first to Hungary and ultimately to Britain. In 1940 he was appointed as the chairman of the cultural section of the exiled Central Association of Czechoslovak Students (USCS), and later joined the exiled Czech Army which fought as a brigade with the British Army in 1944 and 1945, rising to the rank of First Lieutenant. He was awarded the Military Cross, Medal for Bravery, and Medal of Merit, and the Medal for Fidelity by the exiled Czech Government during World War II. In London, Zink was recruited to make broadcasts to his homeland via the BBC Overseas Service, resulting in his family being detained and placed in a concentration camp.

After the war, Zink returned to Czechoslovakia in 1945 and joined the Czech language service of Radio Prague, the international broadcasting station operated by the Foreign Ministry. Zink's anti-Communist reports were heard by Czechs living abroad and, after the Communist Party of Czechoslovakia took power in a 1948 coup, his broadcasts became anti-government. He subsequently lost his job and went into hiding until he, his wife and two-year-old son could flee to England. He became a British subject in 1949, and rejoined the BBC and worked on its European service until 1951. He then joined NATO where he worked as a political and economic analyst until 1957.

Move to Canada
Zink moved to Canada in 1958 with his wife and son and became editor of the Brandon Sun in Manitoba. His editorials won him a National Newspaper Award in 1961 and he was offered a job with the Toronto Telegram as an Ottawa-based columnist. He became a Canadian citizen in 1963. When the Telegram folded in 1971 he moved to the Toronto Sun, becoming one of the paper's original staffers.

Although he was a member of the Ottawa press gallery and his column was ostensibly on national affairs, it was generally a forum for his ardent anti-Communist views. It often attacked Soviet foreign policy, Western liberals who favoured negotiations with the Soviet Union, and Cuba, as well as Canadian Prime Minister Pierre Trudeau, whom Zink viewed as a "crypto-Communist". Zink also ridiculed social programs being introduced by the federal government in the 1960s and 1970s, writing in 1965, "after medicare, what is next on the womb-to-tomb welfare list? Well, there are legalcare, morticare, carcare, housecare, leisurecare, and endless other possibilities." Zink's columns on federal politics were published in three collections, Trudeaucracy (1972),  Viva Chairman Pierre (1977) and What Price Freedom? (1981).

On two occasions Zink ran for a federal parliamentary seat in the riding of Parkdale as the Progressive Conservative candidate, in the 1972 and 1974 federal elections. On both occasions he finished second.

His Toronto Sun columns were syndicated across the Sun News chain and were also picked up by the Christian Science Monitor in the United States.

His anti-Communist themes continued through the era of détente and glasnost, resulting in many of his critics ridiculing him as a relic of the Cold War era or a "one-trick pony who never got over the communist era". Having outlived the Velvet Revolution and the fall of the Soviet Union and in declining health, Zink discontinued his column in 1993.

Awards 
After the fall of Communism, Zink was awarded a number of accolades from his homeland, including the Czech Republic's Medal of Merit, 1st Class in 1995; the Czech Foreign Ministry's Jan Masaryk Gratias Agit Award in 1999; and the Special Prague University Honour Medal in 2001. He was also made an honorary colonel in the Czech army.

References

External Links
Lubor J. Zink fonds (R11600) at Library and Archives Canada

1920 births
2003 deaths
People from Litoměřice District
Canadian anti-communists
Canadian columnists
Progressive Conservative Party of Canada candidates for the Canadian House of Commons
Candidates in the 1972 Canadian federal election
Candidates in the 1974 Canadian federal election
Czech anti-communists
Canadian people of Czech descent
Czechoslovak emigrants to Canada
Toronto Sun people